The Ilmensky Mountains are located in the Southern Urals in the Chelyabinsk Oblast on the administrative territory of Miass in Chebarkulsky and Argayashsky districts.  They are on the Tentative list of UNESCO World Heritage Sites.

They are famous for their precious (like topaz and beryl) and semi-precious stones, such as amazonite and rare metals, found in pegmatites and nepheline syenites. Now most part of Ilmensky Mountains are inside strict Ilmen Nature Reserve and all mining activities there are prohibited.

References

Mountain ranges of Russia
Ural Mountains
Landforms of Chelyabinsk Oblast